Petra Marčinko was the defending champion but decided to participate in the women's singles qualifying, where she lost to CoCo Vandeweghe in the second round.

Alina Korneeva won the title, defeating Mirra Andreeva in the final, 6–7(2–7), 6–4, 7–5.

Seeds

Draw

Finals

Top half

Section 1

Section 2

Bottom half

Section 3

Section 4

Qualifying

Seeds

Qualifiers

Lucky loser
  Elizara Yaneva

Draw

First qualifier

Second qualifier

Third qualifier

Fourth qualifier

Fifth qualifier

Sixth qualifier

Seventh qualifier

Eighth qualifier

References

External links 
 Draw at itftennis.com
 Draw at ausopen.com

Australian Open (tennis) by year – Girls' singles
2023 Australian Open